María Antonia de Armengol Criado (Valencian: Maria Antònia; born 22 September 1950, in Paris, France) is a Spanish politician who belongs to the Spanish Socialist Workers' Party (PSOE).

Married, Armengol qualified as a lawyer and entered politics in 1983 when she was elected as a PSOE deputy to the Cortes Valencianas, the Valencian regional parliament, serving until 2003.

In 2004 she was elected to the Congress of Deputies as a deputy for Valencia region but did not stand at the 2008 election. She also served as a member of the federal committee of the PSOE and was a member of Greenpeace.

References

Members of the 8th Congress of Deputies (Spain)
1950 births
Living people
Spanish Socialist Workers' Party politicians
Women members of the Congress of Deputies (Spain)
20th-century Spanish women politicians
21st-century Spanish women politicians
Members of the 1st Corts Valencianes
Members of the 2nd Corts Valencianes
Members of the 3rd Corts Valencianes
Members of the 4th Corts Valencianes
Members of the 5th Corts Valencianes